Emily Lim (林佩琦; born 5 August 1982) is a Malaysian actress, model, host and nutritionist. In 2005, she participated in the Miss ASTRO International Chinese Pageant contest in Malaysia and made her debut as 1st runner-up, Miss Perfect Body and Miss Elegant. In 2006, she participated in local TV series "The Beginning", which was her first TV series. In 2019, she won the Best Leading Actress in the Kuala Lumpur Film Critics Association of Malaysia (Anugerah Majlis Pengkritik Filem Kuala Limpur) for her local horror film "Two Sisters".

Early life
Born in 1982 into a Peranakan family, Emily was raised in Malacca, and lived with her family close to the Portuguese Settlement. Her childhood was less than idyllic however, as her father constantly imperilled their family. Unsurprisingly enough, her father ran away with the family's money, and never returned. It led to a terrifying experience that involved incensed thugs barging into Emily's household and attempting to abduct her. She was only sixteen years old at the time. In order to reduce the family's burden, Emily actively sought scholarships and worked everywhere to repay her father's debts. Later, she is attracted by the prize money of the beauty contest and resolutely signed up to participate. Finally, as she wished, Emily won the first runner-up of the Malaysia Miss ASTRO Chinese International Pageant and paid off part of the debts. Her time in the entertainment industry seemed to be brief at first, and she entered the corporate world after graduating. Emily's beauty and attractive performance in the pageant caught the attention of the audience and commercial advertisers, and TV drama producers began to invite her to participate in their projects. After discussion and encouragement by her boss of the engineering company, Emily decided to quit her full-time high paid salary job. In 2006, she decided to join the advertising model industry and the showbiz circle.

Personal life
In 2010, Emily began a romantic relationship with actor Alan Yun, she married him on 28 February 2018.

Filmography

Television series

Film

Short Film
2013：Floating Sun - 3 Doors Of Horrors
2014：The Woman Upstairs
2016：SHE
2016：Breaking Point

Host
We Love Kuala Lumpur
NTV7 Good Morning Tai Tai Breakfast Show
The 2nd Asia Success Award Gala Dinner
Mrs. Malaysia International Year 2012
Start Society “I Believe” 2011 Charity Concert
Cellnique Annual Dinner Shanghai Banquet 
Euro Asia Chinese Golf Association Auction Gala night
Euro Asia Chinese Golf Association Invitational Friendship & Charity Golf Competition Award night
I-choice Online Fashion Magazine Launch 
Mother's Day Event Super Mummy Competition 
Poh Kong Jewellery Showcase
Glenmarie Cove Property Launch
Mah Sing Group Annual Dinner
Malaysia Corrugated Carton Manufacturers’ Association Annual Dinner
Federation of Goldsmiths and Jewelers Association of Malaysia Appreciation Night
World Vision Nutrition Talk “Malnutrition in Metropolitan City” in Year 2016
Pensonic Longevity Detox recipes book
Nutrition Talk about “Weight Lost and Diabetes” in Pudu First Assembly of God Church
Develop Health food menu S2 Slimming Center

Advertisement Works
Horlicks、Johnson & Johnson (Thailand)、Oral-B (China)、Mountain Dew (China)、Tourism Malaysia (Korea)、Caltrate (Hong Kong)、Sony (Asia)
Bausch & Lomb、Kao Laurier、LG、DBS (Singapore)、Panadol (Taiwan)、Angel EZ110 Motorbike (Vietnam)、AOWA Electrical Gas Stove (Philippines)
Maybank、Nestle Drumstick、ENO (Singapore)、Dubai Tower (Dubai)、Dettol (hong Kong)、Anmum Milk Powder

Commercial Short Film
Petronas CNY 2019
Petronas Kaamatan
Petronas The Perfect Wedding

Awards/Achievement

Drama

Beauty Pageant

Sport

References 

Living people
1982 births
Malaysian film actresses
Malaysian people of Chinese descent
Malaysian people of Teochew descent
20th-century Malaysian actresses
21st-century Malaysian actresses